Mandt is a surname of Dutch origin. Notable people with the surname include:

André Mandt (born 1993), German footballer
Michael Mandt (born 1971), American television producer
Neil Mandt (born 1969), American television producer
Sonja Mandt (born 1960), Norwegian politician

References

Surnames of Dutch origin